Shaq Diesel is the debut album by American professional basketball player and rapper Shaquille O'Neal, released on October 26, 1993 through Jive Records. The album features production from Ali Shaheed Muhammad, Def Jef, Erick Sermon, K-Cut and Meech Wells, and guest appearances from Def Jef, Phife Dawg and Fu-Schnickens.

Despite mixed reviews, the album became a surprising success, reaching 25 on the Billboard 200 and eventually reaching platinum status on March 21, 1994 for shipping of one million copies.

Two singles from the album also managed to fare well on the charts, "(I Know I Got) Skillz", made it to #35 on the Billboard Hot 100 and managed to reach gold status on December 21, 1993 for shipping of 500,000 copies, while "I'm Outstanding" made it to #47 on the Hot 100. A third single entitled "Shoot Pass Slam" was also released, but did not make it to the Billboard charts.

Track listing

Charts

Weekly charts

Year-end charts

Certifications

References

1993 debut albums
Albums produced by Erick Sermon
Albums produced by K-Cut (producer)
Shaquille O'Neal albums
Jive Records albums